Bordetella holmesii is a Gram-negative, rod-shaped bacterium of the genus Bordetella. It was named in recognition of Barry Holmes, a biologist. It is asaccharolytic, oxidase-negative, and nonmotile, producing a brown pigment. It is associated with sepsis, endocarditis, and respiratory illness, especially in immunocompromised patients, such as asplenic or AIDS patients.
It is often seen in conjunction with Bordetella pertussis infections (whooping cough), although not always.

References

Further reading

External links
 Microbe wiki
 UniProt entry
 Type strain of Bordetella holmesii at BacDive -  the Bacterial Diversity Metadatabase

Burkholderiales
Bacteria described in 1994